USS LST-766 was an LST-542-class Landing Ship, Tank in the United States Navy during World War II that took part in the amphibious landings during the war in the Far East.

Ship history
Under an agreement made between the Commandant and the Chief of Naval Operations, the US Coast Guard supplied officers and crewmen for a number of LSTs. Even with Coast Guard crews all LSTs were commissioned US Navy vessels.  Like most LSTs, LST-766 did not receive a name and is properly referred to by her hull designation.

LST-766 was laid down by the American Bridge Co., in Ambridge, Pa on 13 July 1944. The ship was launched on 30 August 1944, sponsored by Mrs. C. E. Egeler. She made her way down the Ohio and Mississippi Rivers to the Gulf of Mexico through New Orleans. On 25 September 1944, she was commissioned under the command of LT Lester W. Newton, USCGR.

During early October 1944, she underwent sea trials then proceeded to Gulfport, Mississippi for outfitting. She passed through the Panama Canal to San Diego and then on to Pearl Harbor arriving on 10 December 1944. After training in amphibious operations near the Hawaiian islands she joined the Pacific invasion forces off Iwo Jima on 19 February 1945. After completing operations at Iwo Jima she returned to Hawaii.

After further training exercises she set out for Okinawa (via Eniwetok, Guam and Saipan) in April, arriving on 14 July 1945. Between mid-August and late September 1945, LST-766 was engaged in transportation duties between Saipan and Guam, From Okinawa she was deployed to Tsingtao, China. There she broke free of her anchor, and was grounded but freed without damage. She returned to Guam and then, in November 1945 after the end of the war, returned to the United States, via Pearl Harbor, arriving in San Francisco on 16 December 1945. The majority of her Coastguard Crew was discharged, and she was decommissioned there on 19 March 1946 and ultimately sold for commercial use.

LST-766 was awarded one battle star for her service during World War II.

References
Notes

Bibliography

External links
 Naval Historical Center
 
 Unofficial Website of USS LST-766 Includes photos of ship and crew members, and discussion board.

LST-542-class tank landing ships
World War II amphibious warfare vessels of the United States
Ships built in Ambridge, Pennsylvania
1944 ships